Sylvia Lopez (November 10, 1933 – November 20, 1959) was a French model and actress.

Career as a model
Born Tatjana Bernt, she was raised in Paris, where she began a career in modelling. Eventually she modeled for couturier Jacques Fath, the first French fashion designer to export his creations to the United States. Appearing under the name  "Sylvia Sinclair", Bernt earned enough exposure to attract the attention of film producers.

Personal life 
In November 1956 she became the second wife of the composer Francis Lopez.

Career in acting
Lopez made her first of two French-language films following which she appeared in several Italian swashbucklers with American stars such as Steve Reeves and Lex Barker that were commercially successful and for which she received favorable reviews.

Early death

Diagnosed with leukemia, Lopez died a few months after she withdrew while working on the set of a film Voulez-vous danser avec moi? (which was posthumously released a month later) with Brigitte Bardot.

Sylvia Lopez is interred in the Cimetière du Montparnasse in Paris.

5 years later a song called Mon amie la rose was written by Cécile Caulier and first sung by Françoise Hardy, as a single from her third album of the same name.

Filmography

References

External links

French film actresses
1933 births
1959 deaths
Burials at Montparnasse Cemetery
20th-century French actresses